Alban Shabani (born 18 May 2000) is a Kosovan professional footballer who plays as a defensive midfielder for Albanian club Skënderbeu Korçë.

Club career

Skënderbeu Korçë
On 22 October 2020, Shabani signed a four-year contract with Kategoria Superiore club Skënderbeu Korçë and received squad number 6. Ten days later, he made his debut with Skënderbeu Korçë in the 2020–21 Albanian Cup first round against Tomori after coming on as a substitute at 76th minute in place of Uerdi Mara. Three days after debut, Shabani made his first Kategoria Superiore appearance after coming on as a substitute at 80th minute in place of Uerdi Mara in a 1–1 away draw against Teuta Durrës.

International career

Under-19
On 2 October 2018, Shabani was named as part of the Kosovo U19 squad for 2019 UEFA European Under-19 Championship qualifications, he was an unused substitute in these matches.

Under-21
On 6 November 2020, Shabani received a call-up from Kosovo U21 for the 2021 UEFA European Under-21 Championship qualification matches against Albania U21 and Turkey U21. Seven days later, he made his debut with Kosovo U21 in the match against Albania U21 after coming on as a substitute at 76th minute in place of Arton Zekaj.

References

External links

2000 births
Living people
Kosovan footballers
Kosovo under-21 international footballers
Kosovan expatriate footballers
Kosovan expatriate sportspeople in Albania
Association football midfielders
Football Superleague of Kosovo players
KF Llapi players
Kategoria Superiore players
KF Skënderbeu Korçë players